Peg Perego is an Italian manufacturer of juvenile products (i.e., strollers, high chairs, car seats, children’s ride-on toys). In addition to their home location in Italy, the company now has offices in Brazil, Canada, and the United States.

History 

In 1949, Giuseppe Pérego decided to design a baby carriage for his son. His neighbors were impressed and requested their own custom creations. Eventually, the carriages became so popular that he started a company. After carriages, Peg Perego’s baby products have since expanded to include strollers, car seats, and high chairs.

In 1960, the company looked into a slightly more mature market: children's ride-on toys. Peg Perego designed and built plastic, pedal-operated children’s riding vehicles. These toys have become more advanced, and the company now sells battery-powered John Deere, Polaris, Cub Cadet, Ducati, and Vespa ride-on toys for children.

Popular culture 

The Nanny Diaries: Scarlett Johansson pushes a Pliko P3 (Freestyle Mint)

Awards 

Baby and Children’s Product News: 2008 Readers’ Favorites Awards (3rd place-Carseats)

Creative Child Magazine: 2007 Top Choice of the Year (Prima Pappa Best High Chair and Primo Viaggio SIP 30/30 Car Seat)

Creative Child Magazine: 2007 Seal of Excellence (Pliko P3)

Kind + Jugend Innovation Award: 2007 World of Mobile Baby (Skate)

Recall 
On July 24, 2012, The U.S. Consumer Product Safety Commission, in cooperation with Peg Perego USA Inc., of Fort Wayne, Indiana, announced a voluntary recall of about 223,000 strollers due to a risk of entrapment and strangulation.

World Distributors 

 Austria – Peter Herzog Handelsagentur
 Bosnia and Herzegovina – Karaka Promet d.o.o.
 Iran – NiNi Darya Faraz Trad Co
 Czech Republic – Vispa Náchod s.r.o.
 Chile – Ferdel Chile S.A.
 Germany – Marketing und Vertrieb
 Holland – Oku Business Partners
 Israel – Pupik Toys LTD.
 Lebanon – Gebran Geahchan and Sons S.A.L
 Poland – Agnes-Im
 Russia – Bambini LTD.
 Slovenia – Mami d.o.o.
 Spain – Toystecnic Postventa y Recambios
 Sweden – Innogame AS, Maki AS
 Ukraine – Alimpex Group, Peg Perego Ukraine
 United Kingdom – Mamas & Papas LTD.

References

External links 
 
 Toy Store discover
 Peg-Perego pro
 Peg-Perego in Russia
Infant products companies 
Toy companies of Italy
Manufacturing companies of Italy